The 1933 WANFL season was the 49th season of the Western Australian National Football League in its various incarnations. It was the last year of a seven-team senior competition, and saw George Doig, during the second semi-final, become the first player to kick one hundred goals in a season.

The premiership was won by East Fremantle, who claimed its sixth straight minor premiership, after it defeated fourth-placed Subiaco in the Grand Final. Subiaco's feat in reaching the premiership decider was itself a remarkable one, given that the Victorian Football League had deprived it of the majority of it star players: only six of its 1931 Grand Final team played in the corresponding match two seasons later, and the Maroons had been last or second last for most of 1933 before entering the four at the last minute. Old Easts led all season: despite losing a number of key players to the Sydney Carnival during July and August, the blue and whites won two of three games when depleted.

Claremont-Cottesloe finished with its third consecutive wooden spoon, but defender “Sammy” Clarke became the first player to win the Sandover Medal in his debut season.

Home-and-Away season

Round 1 (Labour Day)

Round 2

Round 3

Round 4

Round 5

Round 6

Round 7

Round 8

Round 9

Round 10

Round 11

Round 12

Round 13

Round 14

Round 15

Round 16

Round 17

Round 18

Round 19

Round 20

Round 21

Ladder

Finals

First semi-final

Second semi-final

Preliminary final

Grand Final

Notes
The other pre-1934 clubs’ first 20-goal scores were: Perth – 25.24 (174) v Subiaco in 1904; East Fremantle – 21.11 (137) v Midland Junction in 1905; Subiaco – 20.15 (135) v West Perth in 1913; South Fremantle – 22.15 (147) v Midland Junction in 1916; East Perth – 21.8 (134) v West Perth in 1926; Claremont-Cottesloe – 21.14 (140) v East Perth in 1929. North Fremantle kicked its only 20-goal score of 25.24 (174) against Subiaco as early as 1902.

References

External links
 WAFL Online
 West Australian National Football League (WANFL), 1933

West Australian Football League seasons
1933 in Australian rules football